

The Sisu 1A is a competition sailplane built in the United States in the late 1950s and early 1960s. Originally designed by Leonard Niemi as a homebuilt sailplane, its first flight in 1958 showed such promise that Niemi decided instead to manufacture it in series production. Niemi formed the Arlington Aircraft Company for this purpose. The Sisu 1A quickly proved itself as the most competitive American sailplane ever developed, winning the 1962, 1965, and 1967 U.S. National Soaring Championships. On July 31, 1964, a Sisu 1a piloted by Alvin H. Parker became the first sailplane ever to fly farther than 1000 km.

Aircraft on display
The Arlington Sisu 1A that broke the 1000 km distance record was donated to the Smithsonian Institution and resides in the Udvar-Hazy Center (UHC) of the  National Air and Space Museum.  UHC is located in the Washington, DC suburb of Chantilly, VA near Dulles International Airport.

Specifications (Sisu 1)

References

 
 

1950s United States sailplanes
Glider aircraft
Aircraft first flown in 1958
V-tail aircraft